Diego Rivas Gutiérrez (born 27 April 1980) is a Spanish former professional footballer who played as a defensive midfielder.

He amassed totals of 364 matches and six goals both major levels of Spanish football combined, including 122 games and three goals in La Liga where he represented Atlético Madrid, Getafe and Real Sociedad (over five seasons).

Career
Born in Ciudad Real, Castile-La Mancha, Rivas started playing as a senior in Atlético Madrid's reserves, but could never break into the first team. In the 2002–03 campaign, he served a loan at neighbouring Getafe CF in Segunda División.

Having returned to the Colchoneros, Rivas was definitely waived and, in January 2004, had a second Getafe spell, still contributing with 17 games to a first ever top-flight promotion. He continued to be everpresent from 2004 to 2006, as the side achieved two consecutive ninth-place finishes in La Liga.

Rivas played the first of the following two seasons with Real Sociedad, appearing irregularly as the Basques were relegated and being loaned to Cádiz CF of the second level for 2007–08, in another ill-fated campaign.

Rivas excelled in the following second-tier seasons with Real Sociedad, rarely missing a match and helping the club return to the top level in his second year, while collecting a combined 22 yellow cards. He featured in 32 matches in 2010–11 (31 starts), scoring against former team Atlético Madrid and Sevilla FC, both games ending in home losses, with the club eventually retaining its status.

In late June 2011, 31-year-old Rivas signed for Hércules CF in division two, agreeing on a 2+1 contract. He featured regularly during his spell in the Valencian Community, and on 9 August 2013 joined fellow league side SD Eibar.

Rivas contributed with 20 starts in 1,810 minutes of action during the campaign, as the Armeros were promoted to the top division for the first time ever coached by his former Real Sociedad teammate Gaizka Garitano. On 25 August 2014, he signed a one-year deal with UE Llagostera, newly promoted to the second level.

Rivas retired in May 2018 at the age of 38, after two seasons in Tercera División with CD Manchego Ciudad Real.

Personal life
Rivas' younger brother, Marcos, was also a footballer and a midfielder. He played almost exclusively in amateur football, his biggest achievement being appearing in 13 games for AD Alcorcón in the third division.

Honours
Real Sociedad
Segunda División: 2009–10

Eibar
Segunda División: 2013–14

References

External links

Stats and bio at Cadistas1910 

1980 births
Living people
People from Ciudad Real
Sportspeople from the Province of Ciudad Real
Spanish footballers
Footballers from Castilla–La Mancha
Association football midfielders
La Liga players
Segunda División players
Segunda División B players
Tercera División players
Atlético Madrid C players
Atlético Madrid B players
Atlético Madrid footballers
Getafe CF footballers
Real Sociedad footballers
Cádiz CF players
Hércules CF players
SD Eibar footballers
UE Costa Brava players
UD Socuéllamos players